Moshe "Misha" Lewin (7 November 1921 – 14 August 2010) was a scholar of Russian and Soviet history. He  was a major figure in the school of Soviet studies which emerged in the 1960s.

Biography
Moshe Lewin was born in 1921 in Wilno, Poland (now Vilnius, Lithuania), the son of ethnic Jewish parents who were later murdered in the Holocaust. Lewin lived in Poland for the first 20 years of his life, fleeing to the Soviet Union in June 1941 just ahead of the invading Nazi army. 

For the next two years, Lewin worked as a collective farm worker and as a blast furnace operator in a metallurgical factory. In summer 1943, he enlisted in the Soviet army and was sent to officers' training school. He was promoted on the last day of the war.

In 1946, Lewin returned to Poland before emigrating to France. A believer in Labor Zionism from his youth, in 1951 Lewin emigrated again, this time to Israel, where he worked for a time on a kibbutz and as a journalist. In his thirties, he took up academic studies, receiving his Bachelor of Arts from Tel Aviv University,  in 1961.

That same year, Lewin was awarded a research scholarship to the Sorbonne in Paris, where he studied the collectivization of Soviet agriculture. In 1964, he gained his Ph.D there.

Lewin died on 14 August 2010 in Paris. His papers are housed at the University of Pennsylvania in Philadelphia.

Academic career and major publications
Newly qualified with his doctorate, Lewin was named Director of Study at l'École des hautes études, Paris, where he served from 1965 to 1966. During this time he converted his Sorbonne dissertation into a book, published in French in 1966 and in English two years later as Russian Peasants and Soviet Power.

Russian Peasants and Soviet Power (1968)
This monograph dealt with the Soviet grain procurement crisis of 1928 and the associated political battle, a bitter fight which resulted in a decision to forcibly collectivize Soviet agriculture. 

In this work, Lewin emphasized collectivization as a practical (albeit extreme) solution to a real world problem facing the Soviet regime, one out of several potential solutions to a crisis situation.  Rather than an inevitable and predestined action, collectivization was cast as a brutal manifestation of realpolitik — a view in marked contrast to the traditionalist historiography of the day. Russian Peasants and Soviet Power was initially projected as the first part of a long study of the social history of Soviet Russia down to 1934, although the project seems to have been abandoned, perhaps as duplicative of the work of British historians E.H. Carr and R.W. Davies.

Lenin's Last Struggle (1968)
Lewin's other 1968 publication, Lenin's Last Struggle, was an extended essay that charted the evolution of Lenin's thinking about the growing bureaucracy of Soviet Russia. In it, Lewin additionally chronicled the politics of the post-Lenin succession struggle during the time of Lenin's final illness, emphasizing "lost" alternatives to the actual path of historical development. 

In this book Lewin again offered a perspective in marked contrast to the voluminous writings of the totalitarianist school that then dominated academic writing about the Soviet Union, casting the USSR as a monolithic and fundamentally unchanging structure.

Political Undercurrents in Soviet Economic Debates (1974)
From 1967 to 1968, Lewin was a senior fellow at Columbia University in New York City. Upon completion of his Columbia fellowship, he took a post as a research professor at Birmingham University, England from 1968 until 1978.

During this period Lewin published Political Undercurrents in Soviet Economic Debates: From Bukharin to the Modern Reformers, which, along with the work of Princeton University professor Stephen F. Cohen, helped to restore the name and ideas of Nikolai Bukharin to the academic debate concerning the Soviet 1920s. Lewin noted that many of the same criticisms which Bukharin leveled against Stalin during the political battles of 1928 and 1929 in the USSR were later "adopted by current reformers as their own," thereby adding a contemporary importance to the study of the historical past.

After leaving Birmingham, Lewin returned to the United States. He took up a professorship at the University of Pennsylvania, where he remained until his retirement in 1995.

The Making of the Soviet System (1985)
Although regarded as a doyen of social history and a godfather of the so-called "revisionist" movement of young social historians who came to the fore in Soviet studies during the 1970s and 1980s, Lewin's own work largely centered on the relationship between high politics and economic policy. 

One notable exception came with the publication in 1985 of a collection of Lewin's essays and lectures entitled The Making of the Soviet System. In this work, Lewin visited a number of key topics of social history such as rural social mores, popular religion, customary law in rural society, the social structure of the Russian peasantry, and social relations within Soviet industry. He emerged as a critic of the politicized "What are they up to?" orientation of Soviet studies, favoring a more apolitical perspective that attempted to answer the question, "What makes the Russians tick?"

The Soviet Century (2005)
Lewin's final works attempted to analyze the rise of Mikhail Gorbachev, and his brief efforts at top-down reform of the communist system, and to set the rise and fall of Soviet communism in historical perspective. 

In his last book, The Soviet Century (2005), Lewin argued that the political and economic system of the former Soviet Union constituted a sort of "bureaucratic absolutism" akin to the Prussian bureaucratic monarchy of the 18th century which had "ceased to accomplish the task it had once been capable of performing" and therefore given way.

Legacy

In 1992, Lewin was honored with a Festschrift edited by historians Nick Lampert and Gábor Rittersporn entitled Stalinism: Its Nature and Aftermath: Essays in Honour of Moshe Lewin. Contributors to the volume included economic historians Alec Nove and R.W. Davies as well as key social historians such as Lewis Siegelbaum and Ronald Grigor Suny, among others.

In the Lewin Festschrift, co-editor Lampert summarized Lewin's work in the following manner: "The scope of Lewin's explorations has been very wide, dealing with a panorama of social classes and groups, with the lower depths of society as well as the bosses, with informal social norms as well as formal law, with popular religion as well as established ideology. The range of his intellectual debts is also broad, owing as much to Weber as to Marx, emphasising as much the power of ideologies and myths in human behaviour as the weight of economic structure. The key thing is the perception of society as a socio-cultural whole, though Lewin always remained open to new pathways that might appear in the course of research, always eclectic in the best sense, always eschewing the pursuit of a grand theory for all history — a pursuit which only leads you away from the rich canvas of concrete human experience."

Footnotes

Works

 La Paysannerie et le Pouvoir Sovietique. Paris: Mouton, 1966. English edition: Russian Peasants and Soviet Power: A Study of Collectivization, translated by Irene Nove with John Biggart, London: George Allen and Unwin, 1968.
 Le Dernier Combat de Lénine, Paris: Les Editions de Minuit, 1967. English edition: Lenin's Last Struggle, translated by A.M. Sheridan Smith, New York: Random House, 1968.
 Political Undercurrents in Soviet Economic Debates: From Bukharin to the Modern Reformers, Princeton, NJ: Princeton University Press, 1974. Reissued as Stalinism and the Seeds of Soviet Reform: The Debates of the 1960s (1991).
 The Making of the Soviet System: Essays in the Social History of Interwar Russia, New York: Pantheon, 1985.
 The Gorbachev Phenomenon: A Historical Interpretation, Berkeley: University of California Press, 1988.
 Russia — USSR — Russia: The Drive and Drift of a Superstate, New York: The New Press, 1995.
 Stalinism and Nazism: Dictatorships in Comparison, Co-edited with Ian Kershaw. Cambridge, England: Cambridge University Press, 1997.
 The Soviet Century, London: Verso, 2005.

External links
 Kaiyi Chen, Finding Aid for the Moshe Lewin Papers, University of Pennsylvania, Philadelphia, 1998.
 Sasha Lilly, radio interview with Moshe Lewin: "Against the Grain," Part One and Part Two, Talking History radio show, 2005. —Audio files.
 Moshe Lewin, Articles in Le Monde diplomatique.

1921 births
2010 deaths
20th-century French historians
20th-century Polish Jews
Historians of Russia
Historians of communism
Stalinism-era scholars and writers
Tel Aviv University alumni
Columbia University staff
University of Paris alumni
University of Pennsylvania faculty
French male writers
Polish expatriates in the Soviet Union
Polish emigrants to France
French expatriates in Israel
French expatriates in the United States
World War II refugees
Soviet military personnel of World War II